Cobalt-precorrin 5A hydrolase, CbiG (gene)) is an enzyme with systematic name cobalt-precorrin 5A acylhydrolase. This enzyme catalyses the following chemical reaction

cobalt-precorrin-5A + H2O  cobalt-precorrin-5B + acetaldehyde + 2 H+

This enzyme hydrolyses the ring A acetate delta-lactone of cobalt-precorrin-5A and releases a two-carbon fragment from the macrocyclic corrin ring as acetaldehyde. This is part of the biosynthetic pathway to cobalamin (vitamin B12) in anaerobic bacteria such as Salmonella typhimurium and Bacillus megaterium.

See also
 Cobalamin biosynthesis

References

External links 

EC 3.7.1